Angelo Panelli (c. 1887 – c. 1967) was an Italian stamp forger, operating from Sanremo in the 1920s and 1930s.

Panelli was closely associated with other Italian forgers of the period, particularly Erasmo Oneglia.

See also 
List of stamp forgers
Philatelic fakes and forgeries

References

Further reading 
The Oneglia Engraved Forgeries Commonly Attributed to Angelo Panelli, Robson Lowe & Carl Walske, James Bendon, Limassol, Cyprus, 1996. .

1880s births
1960s deaths
Year of death uncertain
Year of birth uncertain
Stamp forgers
Italian male criminals